The 2006 WABA Cup was the 1st WABA Cup. Winner of the first edition of the Šibenik Jolly who won Gospić Croatia Osiguranje.

Final tournament

Awards
MVP:  Luca Ivanković

References

Vojko Herksel Cup
2006–07 in European women's basketball
2006–07 in Montenegrin basketball
2006–07 in Croatian basketball